Han Lim Lee is a Korean American illustrator. The most notable character, he created is the monkey with attitude, Bobby Jack.

Career

Han started his creative career as a freelance artist selling random prints of his art to various buyers. Han applied as a freelance designer for a clothing manufacturer. While working with at company, he created a lifestyle brand based on a monkey character named Bobby Jack. The name, Bobby Jack, originated from the first names of owners of the company, Bob and Jack. What started out as a monkey print on a shirt, Bobby Jack became a complete lifestyle brand in multiple categories such as accessories, toys, room decor, and stationary. Bobby Jack became the most popular clothing among children.

References

External links
Bobby Jack Brand

Living people
1978 births
American illustrators
American people of Korean descent